Mixodectidae (from Greek μιξο, mixo, "mixed", and δεκτες, dektes "biter") is an extinct family of insectivorous placental mammals in the order Dermoptera.  The mixodectids originated in the late Cretaceous and survived into the Paleocene in Europe and North America.

Description 
While there is less anatomical evidence for this group than for other archaic placental families (such as apatemyids, pantolestids, leptictids, and palaeoryctids), preserved dental and cranial anatomies give an idea of mixodectid dietary requirements.  Their rodent-like dental pattern was similar to that of the multituberculates, with a pair of large, strong, and forward-directed incisors and a row of multi-cusped and low-crowned premolars and molars  a specialized dental set-up probably used for crushing and opening hard seeds and nuts.

Torrejonian (Middle Paleocene) Mixodectidae had a dental set-up similar to the oldest plagiomenids and are therefore supposedly an ancestral or sister group of the latter.  For many years Elipdophorus, the oldest plagiomenid, was classified as Mixodectidae but was finally regarded as more closely related to plagiomenids in the 1970s based on derived dental resemblances.  Though the relation between Mixodectidae and other early placental mammals from the "insectivore-primate transition" remain unclear, clearly a number of the archaic mixodectid dental features seem to foreshadow the more derived conditions of plagiomenids.  Furthermore, the postcranial skeleton of Mixodectes shows arboreal specialization similar to those of plesiadapids and dermopterans, supporting their inclusion within Euarchonta.

See also 

 Colugo
 Planetetherium

Notes

References

External links 

 

Prehistoric placental mammals
Paleocene mammals
Prehistoric mammals of North America
Prehistoric mammals of Europe
Paleocene first appearances
Paleocene extinctions
Fossil taxa described in 1883
Prehistoric mammal families